Ionuț Matei (born 2 July 1984 in Bacău) is a Romanian football player, who plays for F.C. Romania.

External links
 
 

1984 births
Living people
Sportspeople from Bacău
Romanian footballers
Association football midfielders
CS Otopeni players
FCM Bacău players
FC Politehnica Timișoara players
CSM Reșița players
CSM Ceahlăul Piatra Neamț players
FC Botoșani players
CSU Voința Sibiu players
F.C. Romania players
Liga I players